Riders of the Northwest Mounted is a 1943 American Western film directed by William Berke and written by Fred Myton. The film stars Russell Hayden, Dub Taylor, Bob Wills, Adele Mara, Dick Curtis and Richard Bailey. The film was released on February 15, 1943, by Columbia Pictures.

Plot

Cast          
Russell Hayden as Lucky Kerrigan
Dub Taylor as Cannonball
Bob Wills as Bob Wheeler
Adele Mara as Gabrielle Renard
Dick Curtis as Victor Renard
Richard Bailey as Remi
Jack Ingram as Jacques
Leon McAuliffe as Chuck
Vernon Steele as Capt. Blair
Bill Hunter as Trapper

References

External links
 

1943 films
American Western (genre) films
1943 Western (genre) films
Columbia Pictures films
Films directed by William A. Berke
American black-and-white films
Royal Canadian Mounted Police in fiction
Northern (genre) films
1940s English-language films
1940s American films